The Tasmanian Government Personal Information Card is a voluntary identity photo card issued to residents of Tasmania, Australia available to people of all ages.

References

Identity documents of Australia